The 2012 United States Senate election in Minnesota took place on November 6, 2012, concurrently with the U.S. presidential election as well as other elections to the United States Senate and House of Representatives as well as various state and local elections. Incumbent Democratic–Farmer–Labor U.S. Senator Amy Klobuchar was reelected to a second term, defeating the Republican nominee, State Representative Kurt Bills, by almost one million votes and carrying all but two of the state's 87 counties by double digits.

Background 
Incumbent Amy Klobuchar was first elected in 2006 to succeed the retiring DFL incumbent Mark Dayton. She beat Republican nominee Mark Kennedy, 58% to 38%. Klobuchar served as Minnesota's only senator between January 3 and July 7, 2009, due to the contested results of Minnesota's senatorial election held the previous year, finally decided in favor of DFLer Al Franken.

DFL primary 
The Minnesota Democratic–Farmer–Labor Party held its Senate primary on August 14, 2012.

Candidates

Declared 
 Dick Franson, perennial candidate
 Amy Klobuchar, incumbent U.S. Senator
 Jack Shepard, dentist, convicted felon, fugitive and perennial candidate
 Darryl Stanton

Results

Republican primary 
The Republican Party of Minnesota held its nominating convention in May 2012 and held its Senate primary on August 14, 2012.

Candidates

Declared 
 Kurt Bills, state representative; won May 2012 convention nomination
 David Carlson, former Marine Corps sergeant; candidate in August 2012 primary
 Bob Carney Jr., inventor, independent businessman; finished 2nd in 2010 GOP primary for Governor of Minnesota, candidate in August 2012 primary

Withdrew 
 Joe Arwood, St. Bonifacius city councilman; withdrew before May 2012 convention
 Pete Hegseth, executive director of Vets for Freedom; withdrew after May 2012 convention
 Anthony Hernandez, former state senate candidate; withdrew before May 2012 convention to run for Congress against Betty McCollum
 Dan Severson, former state representative; withdrew after May 2012 convention

Results

Independence primary

Campaign 
The Independence Party of Minnesota did not plan to run a candidate in the general election. Party chairman Mark Jenkins said in November 2011 that he saw the Senate election as "a distraction from having our best and brightest engaged in state legislative races". At the party's convention in June 2012, neither candidate was endorsed. Williams won a majority of the votes and came within two votes of the required 60% needed for the party's endorsement. He proceeded with his run for the Senate but the party focused its attention on state legislative races.

Candidates 
 Stephen Williams, farmer and Independence Party endorsed candidate for the U.S. Senate in 2008
 Glen R. Anderson Menze, accountant and Republican nominee in 2008 and Independence Party nominee in 2010 for the 7th congressional district

Results

General election

Candidates 
 Amy Klobuchar (DFL), incumbent U.S. Senator
 Kurt Bills (Republican), State Representative
 Stephen Williams  (Independence), Farmer
 Michael Cavlan, (Minnesota Open Progressives) Registered Nurse
 Tim Davis, (Grassroots), Environmental Activist

Debates 
On August 29 Klobuchar and Bills held their second debate at the State Fair, sponsored by MPR News. Their third debate, on September 16 in Duluth, was about the nation's struggle with deficit spending and unemployment. The audience was assembled by the Duluth Area Chamber of Commerce and Duluth News Tribune.
External links
 Complete video at Minnesota Public Radio, second debate, August 29, 2012
 Audio from Minnesota Public Radio, third debate, September 18, 2012

Fundraising

Top contributors 
This section lists the top contributors by employer. These organizations themselves didn't donate, but these numbers include donations from their PACs, members, employees, owners, and their immediate families.

Top industries

Predictions

Polling 

Republican primary

General election

Results

See also 
 2012 United States Senate elections
 2012 United States House of Representatives elections in Minnesota

References

External links 
 Election Center from the Minnesota Secretary of State
 Campaign contributions at OpenSecrets.org
 Outside spending at the Sunlight Foundation
 Candidate issue positions at On the Issues
 U.S. Senate election coverage at Minnesota Public Radio

Official campaign websites (Archived)
 Kurt Bills for U.S. Senate
 Amy Klobuchar for U.S. Senate
 Stephen Williams for U.S. Senate

2012
Minnesota
Senate
Amy Klobuchar